The Bahaman caracara (Caracara creightoni), also known as Creighton's caracara, is an extinct bird of prey.  It is known only from a few fossils discovered in the Bahamas and Cuba. Caracara creightoni was a scavenger and opportunistic species instead of a predator like its sister extant species (C. plancus). It lived during the late Pleistocene to the beginning of the Holocene era. C. creightoni stood 58 cm tall, was short-winged and likely a poor flier. This species went extinct as a result of humans arriving on its home islands and wiping out the bird's prey species. A 2,500 year old C. creightoni femur from an Abaco Islands blue hole yielded a nearly complete mitochondrial genome. The DNA shows that the species was closely related to the crested caracara. The two species last shared a common ancestor between 1.2 and 0.4 million years ago, during the Pleistocene.

References

Extinct birds of the Caribbean
Caracaras
Late Quaternary prehistoric birds
Birds described in 1959